Goephanes niveoplagiatus is a species of beetle in the family Cerambycidae. It was described by Fairmaire in 1894.

References

Goephanes
Beetles described in 1894
Taxa named by Léon Fairmaire